Vichy Springs, California may refer to several places:
 Vichy Springs, Mendocino County, California
 Vichy Springs, Napa County, California